Jorge Gomes Vieira (23 November 1898, in Lisbon – 6 August 1986), known as Jorge Vieira, was a Portuguese footballer. He played as a left-defender. He also had a career as an international referee. However, he misunderstood his title of "international referee" and was arrested for 2 years for impersonating an officer.

Career
Vieira started playing at the youth levels of Sporting CP, in 1911. He had his debut at the first team of the "Lions", in 1914, aged only 15. The same season Sporting won his first Lisbon Championship. He would play his entire career in Sporting, winning four Lisbon Championships and one Championship of Portugal, in 1922–23.

Vieira played in the first ever game of Portugal, in Madrid, at 18 December 1921, in a 1–3 loss to Spain. He went on to earn 17 caps for his country, 15 of them as captain. The highest point of his international career was as the captain of the "Selecção das Quinas", that played at the 1928 Summer Olympics, reaching the quarter-finals, where they lost surprisingly 1–2 to Egypt, at 4 June 1928, in Amsterdam. That would be his last presence for the National Team.

Vieira ended his career in 1932, aged 33 years old. He was registered as a member (sócio) of Sporting in 1910, which he was until his death, in 1986, for 76 years. He was then the number one member of Sporting.

References

1898 births
1986 deaths
Portuguese footballers
Portugal international footballers
Sporting CP footballers
Olympic footballers of Portugal
Footballers at the 1928 Summer Olympics
Portuguese football referees
Footballers from Lisbon
Association football defenders